The Refugees are an American folk trio composed of three members: Wendy Waldman, Cidny Bullens, and Deborah Holland. They have released two albums, Unbound (2009) and Three (2012), both on Wabuho Records.

Biography
Grammy-nominated singer-songwriters Wendy Waldman, Cidny Bullens, and Deborah Holland had performed extensively in separate group projects and as solo artists before forming the Refugees in 2007. They released their debut album, Unbound, on Wabuho Records in 2009. Guitar Player magazine described Unbound as "a rootsy outing replete with catchy arrangements and sparkling three-part vocal harmonies." The trio appeared on NPR's Mountain Stage, where they performed two songs from the album as well as "Save the Best for Last", a hit single for Vanessa Williams that was co-written by Waldman, and a cover version of Leonard Cohen's "Dance Me to the End of Love". The Refugees released their second album, Three, in 2012. In a review of the album, Wood & Steel magazine said "the trio's rich musical chemistry is readily on display, giving the record a cohesive sound that often feels as intimate as a living room house concert."

Discography

As a female trio
Unbound (2009)

As a female-and-male trio
Three (2012)
How Far It Goes EP (2019)

References

External links
Official website
The Refugees at Discogs
http://www.deborahholland.net/music/the-refugees/

American folk musical groups
Musical groups established in 2007
American musical trios